Columbine may refer to:

Places
 Columbine, Colorado, a census-designate place in Jefferson and Arapahoe counties in Colorado, United States
 Columbine High School, a high school in Columbine, Colorado, United States
 Columbine Memorial, a memorial in Columbine, Colorado, United States, commemorating the Columbine High School massacre
 Columbine, Routt County, Colorado, an unincorporated community and historic district in Routt County, Colorado, United States
 Columbine Peak, a mountain in California

Massacres
 Columbine High School massacre, a 1999 school shooting in Columbine, Colorado
 Columbine Mine massacre, occurring during a 1927 strike by coal miners

Arts, entertainment, and media

Fictitious characters
 Columbine (the commedia dell'arte) or Columbina, a stock character in the Commedia dell'arte
 Columbine, a stock character in Harlequinade

Other uses in arts, entertainment, and media
 Columbine (album), an album by Aura Dione
 Columbine (book), a 2009 book about the school shooting
 Columbine, a 1950 painting by Max Beckmann
 Bowling for Columbine, a 2002 film about the school shooting
 , a French hip-hop band

Biology
 Columbine (plant) or Aquilegia, a genus of flowers
 Stiboges nymphidia or columbine, a metalmark butterfly
 Columbine, pertaining to birds of the family Columbidae (doves and pigeons)

People
 Edward H. Columbine, Naval Officer

Transportation
 Columbine, a locomotive of the Grand Junction Railway
 Columbine, a former passenger service operated by Union Pacific Railroad
 Columbine II and Columbine III, the Lockheed Constellation presidential aircraft used by US president Dwight D. Eisenhower
 HMS Columbine, a list of ships of the Royal Navy
 HMS Columbine (1806), an 18-gun Cruizer-class brig-sloop
 HMS Wild Swan (1876) or HMS Columbine, an Osprey-class screw sloop

Other uses
 Columbine, a racehorse in the 1842 Grand National

See also

 
 Colombine (disambiguation)
 Colombino (disambiguation) 
 Colombina (disambiguation) 
 Colombian (disambiguation) 
 Colombiana (disambiguation) 
 Colombia (disambiguation) 
 Columbia (disambiguation) 
 Columbian (disambiguation) 
 Columbiana (disambiguation) 
 Columbiad (disambiguation) 
 Columbina (disambiguation)